Lorenzo Gennari (also known as Ariminese; 15951665–72) was an Italian painter.

Gennari was born in Cento in 1595 to the painter Benedetto.  From 1615–17, Gennari was apprenticed to Guercino and frescoed the Pannini family home in Cento; afterwards, he followed the senior painter to Bologna.  Cassandra and Coroebus (The Capture of Cassandra and Death of Coroebus)—previously The Inspiration of Cassandra—was painted between 1615–30; it was originally attributed to Guercino, but "is too clumsy to even be a copy of a lost painting of his. It is certainly an autonomous work by Gennari, but based on drawings by Guercino."  Gennari died between 1665 and 1672 in Rimini.

References

1595 births
17th-century deaths
17th-century Italian painters
Italian male painters
People from Cento